KDGO (1240 AM) is a radio station broadcasting a News Talk Information format. Licensed to Durango, Colorado, United States, the station serves the Four Corners area. The station is currently owned by Winton Road Broadcasting Co., LLC and features programming from ABC Radio and Premiere Radio Networks.

FM translator
KDGO also relays its signal to an FM translator broadcasting on 98.3 mHz.

References

External links
FCC History Cards for KDGO

DGO
Radio stations established in 1983